Manumation is the automation of paper based processes in public sector and business without improvement regarding its efficiency. Automation of an inefficient process does not lead to an improvement in case of manumation. 

Manumation is also a term for automated systems, which require more manual work than the original manual process.

Definitions

Examples 
Computerized transaction processing is the automation of previously manual transactions.

See also 
 Semi-automation

References 

Impact of Automation
Systems analysis